, born August 7, 1965, is a retired Japanese professional baseball player from Sapporo, Hokkaidō, Japan.

Sato joined the Fukuoka Daiei Hawks at age 28, but did not live up to expectations with the team. He was traded to the Yakult Swallows in 1996, and played in 113 games in 1999, marking a .341 batting average. He also broke the team record with 25 consecutive game hits. He was relegated to pinch-hitting duty afterwards, and retired after the 2005 season at age 40. He currently works as a batting coach under Tokyo Yakult Swallows manager Junji Ogawa.

He won a bronze medal in the 1992 Summer Olympics before entering the Japanese professional leagues.

References

Baseball Reference

1965 births
Living people
Baseball people from Sapporo
Baseball players at the 1992 Summer Olympics
Olympic baseball players of Japan
Olympic bronze medalists for Japan
Olympic medalists in baseball
Fukuoka Daiei Hawks players
Yakult Swallows players
Japanese baseball coaches
Nippon Professional Baseball coaches
Baseball players at the 1990 Asian Games
Medalists at the 1992 Summer Olympics
Asian Games competitors for Japan